Å (from å meaning "stream") is a village in Moskenes Municipality in Nordland county, Norway. It is connected to the rest of the archipelago by the European route E10 highway, which ends here. This part of the highway is also called King Olav's Road.  

Until the 1990s, Å was mainly a small fishing village specializing in stockfish, but since then tourism has taken over as the main economic activity.  The town features the Lofoten Stockfish Museum and the Norwegian Fishing Village Museum as two big tourist attractions.

Name
The village (originally a farm) is first known to be mentioned in 1567 as "Aa". The name is from Old Norse word "á" which means "(small) river".  The name was spelled "Aa" until 1917 when the Norwegian language reform changed the letter "aa" to "å". The village is sometimes referred to as Å i Lofoten ("i" means "in") to distinguish it from other meanings that go by Å (see Å (disambiguation)).

In media
In 2008, Joanna Lumley visited Å in the Lofoten Islands, for the BBC One television documentary Joanna Lumley: In the Land of the Northern Lights; where she learned about the village's fishing heritage, during her journey to see the Aurora Borealis.

Notable people
 Hank von Hell, rock singer, brought up here.

References

External links

 The Lofoten Stockfish Museum
 The Norwegian Fishing Village Museum

Moskenes
Villages in Nordland
Populated places in Nordland